Copelatus fluviaticus is a species of diving beetle. It is part of the genus Copelatus of the subfamily Copelatinae in the family Dytiscidae. It was described by Félix Guignot in 1957.

References

fluviaticus
Beetles described in 1957